Gordon Hill railway station serves Gordon Hill in the London Borough of Enfield, north London. It was opened on 4 April 1910. The station and the trains serving it are currently operated by Great Northern.

Three platforms are currently in use: Hertford-bound trains stop at platform 3 and London-bound trains stop at platform 2; platform 1 is a terminus platform used by certain trains to and from London, mainly during peak hours.  A fourth platform face (opposite platform 3) is now disused - this was once used by North London Railway services to/from Broad Street.

In autumn 2008, a new Shere FASTticket self-service ticket machine, accepting both cash and debit/credit cards was installed.

Services

All services at Gordon Hill are operated by Great Northern using  EMUs.

The typical off-peak service in trains per hour is:
 2 tph to 
 2 tph to  via 

During the peak hours, the station is served by an additional half-hourly service between Moorgate and Hertford North, as well as a number of additional services to and from Moorgate that terminate at Gordon Hill.

Oyster
 Oyster Pay As You Go, introduced at this station on 2 January 2010, allows customers to make use of the Oyster card readers at the station.

Connections
London Buses route W8 serves the station.

References

Hornby, Frank (1995) London Commuter Lines. Volume 1: Main lines north of the Thames. Kettering: Silver Link Publishing Ltd.

External links

Enfield, London
Railway stations in the London Borough of Enfield
Former Great Northern Railway stations
Railway stations in Great Britain opened in 1910
Railway stations served by Govia Thameslink Railway